Nowe Ogrody  (German: Neugrätz) is a settlement in the administrative district of Wschowa, within Wschowa County, Lubusz Voivodeship, in western Poland.

References

Nowe Ogrody